The men's 'Soft Styles' category involved seven contestants from five countries across two continents - Europe and North America.  Each contestant went through seven performances (2 minutes each) with the totals added up at the end of the event.  The gold medallist was Russian Andrey Bosak who claimed his second individual gold medal in musical forms.  The silver went to Germany's Michael Moeller and the bronze to Russia's Evgeny Krylov.

Results

See also
List of WAKO Amateur World Championships
List of WAKO Amateur European Championships
List of male kickboxers

References

External links
 WAKO World Association of Kickboxing Organizations Official Site

Kickboxing events at the WAKO World Championships 2007 Coimbra
2007 in kickboxing
Kickboxing in Portugal